Jae Deal is an American composer, arranger, music producer, and orchestrator in various genres including pop, gospel, and hip hop as well as a Professor of Music Production, Music Technology, and Hip Hop Music & Culture at the USC Thornton School of Music. He's a session keyboardist, programmer, and bassist in Los Angeles, California. Jae Deal has worked behind the scenes and on stage with several premiere artists including Janet Jackson, Lady Gaga, Snoop Dogg, Diddy, Mary Mary, Karen Clark Sheard, Ne-Yo, Faith Evans, Tye Tribbett, T-Pain, Jessica Simpson and Wynton Marsalis.  He has also contributed to the works of Elton John, Jill Scott and songwriter, Diane Warren. Other projects have included performances with the Baltimore Symphony Orchestra and musical direction for Kirk Franklin’s Youth Ministry at Faithful Central Bible Church.

Early life 
Jae Deal is from Baltimore, Maryland and began playing instruments at the age of seven. He attended Friends School of Baltimore, the oldest private school in Baltimore. By the time Jae was in high school, he was already a skillful bass guitar and synthesizer player. By the tenth grade, he was participating in PBS specials, international tours, and performances for the Pope with Dr. Nathan Carter of the Morgan State University Choir. Shortly after high school, Gospel music producer Steven Ford hired Jae to play on two major gospel recordings. The first was Vickie Winans, Live in Detroit. It was her first live recording and it was nominated for a Stellar Award. The second was T.D. Jakes’ Woman Thou Art Loosed. It won a Stellar Award and was Grammy nominated.

Jae Deal attended Morgan State University in Baltimore, Maryland graduating with a Bachelor of Science in Pure Mathematics. He studied classical music independently in his college years. Jae Deal's parallel education in music and mathematics have let him employ a mathematically inclined methodology towards analysis and production of music as he explains in an interview with Jammcard.

Career 
After moving to Los Angeles, Jae Deal began working with young pop artists such as Christina Milian, Marques Houston, and Omarion. Jae Deal also performed with his childhood friend, Mario (entertainer) on Good Morning America. Deal continued to work as a live musician, orchestrator, director and programmer and live musician for several tours, and recording sessions. Projects included Elton John, Snoop Dogg & the Snoopadelics, Mary Mary, Karen Clark Sheard and Jill Scott. Other projects have included Christmas specials, the Baltimore Symphony Orchestra, performing alongside Wynton Marsalis in Darin Atwater’s Soulful Symphony debut and a year and a half stint as arranger with legendary songwriter Diane Warren.

In 2008, Jae served as the orchestrator and Pro Tools programmer on Janet Jackson's "Rock Witchu Tour".

Deal is currently refining what he describes as a topological methodology for analyzing and composing music.

Additional work 

 Jae Deal produced and directed the performances of the Millennium Harmony Orchestra at the AFRAM arts festival in Baltimore, MD.
Jae Deal, alongside Hollywood curator Monica Payne, co-created and produced #FLASHLIGHT, a progressive musical performance series based in Los Angeles.  Featured musicians included producers Ethan Farmer, Keith Harris, Ish a.k.a. “Wow Jones” & musicians Kamasi Washington and Tony Royster Jr. Featured DJs included MC Lyte and DJ Smooth Dee.
On May 9, 2019 Deal was the producer, host, and music director for "The Jammjam" event presented by Jammcard honoring George Clinton and Parliament-Funkadelic for receiving the Grammy Lifetime Achievement Award. Stars including Ice Cube, Anderson .Paak, CeeLo Green, Flea (musician), Eddie Griffin, and Dj Battlecat jammed alongside members of Parliament-Funkadelic.

Community 
Years before becoming a professor at USC Thornton School of Music, Jae participated in music tutoring programs and appeared as a motivational speaker:

 G.A.M.E. (Gilmor and Morgan Exchange) - Baltimore, MD - Jae Deal was founder and director of The GAME program, of the 503 Academy, which connected Gilmor Elementary School students with college students from Morgan State University for mentoring.
 UCLA – "Ethnomusicology M119: The Cultural History of Rap (Hip Hop)" - Los Angeles , CA - Jae Deal was a guest lecturer discussing the chronology of technological development alongside the Hip-Hop culture, considering future trends in Hip-Hop technology.
 Los Angeles College of Music 2016 " - Pasadena , CA - Jae Deal wrote the Songwriting 1 curriculum for the Los Angeles College of Music ,served as an instructor of Songwriting 1 and Industry Showcase and provided career counseling.
 Musicians Institute 2018 " - Hollywood , CA - Jae taught Networking Strategies and Artist Development in the Music Business department of Musicians Institute .

Associations / awards 
 Part-Time Lecturer, University of Southern California, Thornton School of Music
Guest Lecturer, UCLA School of Ethnomusicology
 Member, American Society of Composers, Authors and Publishers (ASCAP)
Member and judge, Jammcard
Jae Deal and co-composer Tia P won the 2016 International John Lennon Songwriting Contest in the category of Hip-Hop. In the same year both artists were the first international contestants to win the Australia's Vanda & Young Songwriting Competition.

Endorsements / affiliations 
 KORG U.S.A.
 Propellerhead's Reason
 Moog Music, Inc
 ROLI

References

External links

 Jae Deal - Official site
 Propellerhead.se
 KORG U.S.A.
 DISCOGS Profile
 ROLI

American hip hop record producers
Living people
Year of birth missing (living people)
American male composers
21st-century American composers
21st-century American male musicians

ru:Тимбалэнд